Frindle is a middle-grade American children's novel written by Andrew Clements, illustrated by Brian Selznick, and published by the company Aladdin in 1996. It was the winner of the 2016 Phoenix Award, which is granted by the Children's Literature Association to the best English-language children's book that did not win a major award when it was published twenty years earlier.

Frindle was Clements's first novel; all of his previous works had been picture books. According to Clements, the book originated from the thought, "What would happen if a kid started using a new word, and other kids really liked it, but his teacher didn't?"

Plot
Nicholas "Nick" Allen is a class clown who has been formulating creative schemes throughout grade school. At the start of fifth grade in 1987, he is unhappy because his English teacher is the no-nonsense Mrs. Granger. One day, in an attempt to forestall, Nick decides to question Granger on where each word in the dictionary comes from. This backfires, as Mrs. Granger assigns him an essay about it. From this experience, Nick learns that individuals get to determine what words mean, and when he comes across a gold colored pen in the street, he decides to give a "pen" a new name: frindle.

Nick's classmates really like the idea and soon, every child in the fifth grade starts using the word frindle. Mrs. Granger makes any students who are caught saying frindle stay after school and write lines, but this proves to be a problem, as this causes almost every student to stay after school. The school principal decides to visit Nick's house to end the use of frindle, but the situation is beyond Nick's personal control, and the word's usage cannot be curtailed. Frindle starts to gain national attention, and a family friend purchases the merchandising rights to the word. The word frindle spreads across the nation, and Nick thinks through the trouble that this one scheme has caused.

In the epilogue, Nick is a young adult. Mrs. Granger sends him a new copy of the dictionary, recently updated to include new words, including the word frindle. She includes a letter, in which she explains that she intentionally stood against the word in order to make it more popular. Nick sends back a present — the pen that started it all, engraved with the words, "This object belongs to Mrs. Lorelei Granger, and she may call it any name she chooses."

Awards and honors
The U.S. National Education Association named Frindle one of "Teachers' Top 100 Books for Children" based on a 2007 online poll.

In 2012, it was ranked number 38 among all-time children's novels in a survey published by School Library Journal, a monthly with a primarily U.S. audience.

The book has received more than 35 awards and honors, including among other schoolchildren's choice awards:

Judy Lopez Memorial Honor Book (L.A.), Award 97
1998–99 Maud Hart Lovelace Award, MN Youth Rdg. Award
Prize Cento, 1998, Cento, Italy
Year 1999 Young Hoosier Book Award
 2016 Phoenix Award

Film adaptation
In 2015, it was announced that a film adaptation was in development with Mike Karz and Bill Bindley producing and Sam Harper penning the script. Susan Sarandon signed on to portray Mrs. Lorelei Granger. , no further development has been announced.

References

External links

Books by Andrew Clements
American children's novels
1996 American novels
Novels set in elementary and primary schools
1996 children's books
1996 debut novels